Wild Life is a 2023 American documentary film directed and produced by Elizabeth Chai Vasarhelyi and Jimmy Chin that follows conservationist Kris Tompkins and her husband, entrepreneur Douglas Tompkins. The film was produced by Little Monster Films for National Geographic Documentary Films and will premiere at the 2023 South by Southwest Film Festival and be released theatrically by Picturehouse in select U.S. cities beginning on April 14, 2023, with a broadcast debut on the National Geographic Channel on May 25, 2023, and streaming beginning on Disney+ the following day.

Synopsis 
Wild Life chronicles the close relationship of conservationist Kris Tompkins, who dedicated her life to protecting wild life, and her husband Douglas Tompkins, an outdoorsman and entrepreneur who helped pioneer outdoor brands Patagonia, The North Face, and Esprit, and who together, spanning decades of work, created national parks throughout Chile and Argentina and preserved one of the last wild places on Earth by making the largest private land donation in history.

Production 
In an interview for Vanity Fair at the 49th edition of the Telluride Film Festival in Colorado, director Vasarhelyi called the making of the film "a process" in order to convince Kris Tompkins to make a film depicting her journey despite being from a generation that is uncomfortable talking about itself. To overcome this, director Chin stated, "So we took it upon ourselves to do that, because they created a roadmap in conservation for future generations to follow." The filmmakers admitted intimidation at the beginning of the 8-year project, as for Chin, Doug Tompkins was his mentor, and for Vasarhelyi, they were heroes, and their story required "responsibility" and "justice".

Release 
On March 9, 2023, National Geographic Documentary Films and Picturehouse announced that Wild Life, by Academy Award-winning directors Chai Vasarhelyi and Jimmy Chin, had a surprise screening at the 2022 Telluride Film Festival and that it would be part of the 2023 SXSW Film Festival beginning on March 12, 2023. It was also announced that Picturehouse would open the film theatrically in select cities beginning on April 14, 2023, in New York City and Washington, D.C., with additional dates to follow in cities throughout the United States until May 5, and that it would have its broadcast debut on the National Geographic Channel on May 25, 2023, and on the streaming service Disney+ the following day.

References

External links 
 
 
 Official trailer on YouTube

2020s American films
2023 films
2023 documentary films
American documentary films
Documentary films about historical events
Films directed by Elizabeth Chai Vasarhelyi
Films directed by Jimmy Chin
National Geographic Society films
Upcoming films